Martfeld is a municipality in the district of Diepholz, in Lower Saxony, Germany. It is part of the Bruchhausen-Vilsen (Samtgemeinde) Collective Municipality.

Geography

Geographic Location
Martfeld is located approximately 36 km southeast of  Bremen.

Neighbors
Neighboring communities are Schwarme and Bruchhausen-Vilsen

Community Breakdown
The following places belong administratively to Martfeld:
Hollen
Hustedt
Kleinenborstel
Loge
Martfelder Heide
Tuschendorf

History
The village was first mentioned in a papal document personally signed by Pope Alexander III in 1179.

Politics

Municipal Council
SPD - 3 Seats
Green - 2 Seats
Others - 8 Seats

Partner Towns
 La Bazoge in France

Culture and the Arts

Structures
Martfeld Mill: The Martfeld mill was first mentioned in the year 1583. Originally built as a block windmill, in 1840 it was rebuilt in three story Dutch-style. The mill burned to the ground after a lightning strike in 1851 and was rebuilt the same year. Between 1992 and 1999 the mill was completely renovated. The mill is the oldest windmill in the area.
Fehsenfeldsche Mill: Built in 1871 in the three story Dutch-style, the mill operated until 1971. In 1991 the mill was restored and is now used for weddings.

Public Art
 On the village square can be found the stainless steel sculpture titled, “Entfaltund” (Development) by the Syke artists Elsa Töbelmann and Henning Greve. The sculpture was created in 1999 as part of the competition, “Our Village Beautiful.”

References

Diepholz (district)